Briga Novarese is a comune (municipality) in the Province of Novara in the Italian region of Piedmont, located about  northeast of Turin and about  northwest of Novara.

Briga Novarese borders the following municipalities: Borgomanero, Gozzano, and Invorio.

References

External links
 Official website

Cities and towns in Piedmont